Séamus Hetherton (1930 – 11 July 2019) was an Irish Gaelic footballer who played for Cavan Championship club Munterconnaught. He played at senior level for the Cavan county team for five seasons, during which time he usually lined out at right wing-forward.

Honours
St Finian's College
Leinster Colleges Senior Football Championship (1): 1949

Cavan
All-Ireland Senior Football Championship (1): 1952
Ulster Senior Football Championship (2): 1952, 1954

References

1930 births
2019 deaths
Cavan inter-county Gaelic footballers
Gaelic football forwards
20th-century Irish Roman Catholic priests